Francisco Soto, better known by his stage name Don Cisco (originally Cisco the Frisco Mac), is an American rapper and producer.

Biography
Don Cisco has been a part of the San Francisco rap scene since the early 1990s. He released his first single, "Audi 5000", on 12" vinyl and cassettes in 1992. His first full-length studio album, Til the Wheels Fall Off, was released in 1998. Both projects were released under his early moniker, Cisco the Frisco Mack.

In 2000 he released his second studio album, Oh Boy. The album featured guest performances by Mac Dre, Kurupt, Soopafly, Roscoe, Roger Troutman, B-Legit and PSD.

Around the early 2000s, Don Cisco was one fourth of the Latin rap supergroup, Latino Velvet. The group was originally composed of Jay Tee and Baby Beesh for the 1997 album, Latino Velvet Project.  Although the album featured several tracks with Frost and Don Cisco, it wasn't until their 2000 release, Velvet City, that both rappers were featured on the cover of a Latino Velvet album with equal billing to Jay Tee and Baby Beesh. Velvet City featured several west coast artists, including E-40, Levitti, Rappin' 4-Tay, Bosko, Cool Nutz, Poppa LQ and The Mary Jane Girls. Since their first release in 1997, Don Cisco has remained a presence on all of the Latino Velvet albums, either as a group member or as a featured performer.

Discography

Studio albums
Til the Wheels Fall Off (1998)
Oh Boy (2000)
Hustler's Paradise (2005)

Collaboration albums
Velvet City with Latino Velvet (2000)

Compilation albums
West Coast Locos (2002)
Still Hustlin''' (2006)

MixtapesMenudo Mix with Latino Velvet (2004)Mecca of tha Game'' (2004)

Guest appearances

See also
List of Chicano Rappers

References

External links
[ Don Cisco] at Allmusic
Don Cisco at Discogs

American rappers of Mexican descent
Living people
Rappers from San Francisco
Underground rappers
American hip hop record producers
Year of birth missing (living people)
21st-century American rappers
Record producers from California